Mesa High School is a public high school in Mesa, Arizona, United States. Mesa High School currently accommodates grades 9–12 as part of Mesa Public Schools. Mesa High School is the oldest high school in Mesa, Arizona, and is home of the Jackrabbits. Mesa High has more than 3,200 students and boasts award-winning athletics, music, theatre programs and more.

History 

In early 1898, citizens in the Mesa area petitioned for and voted to establish a high school district. Its first classes began in September 1899 on the second floor of the red brick north elementary school, later rebuilt and known as Irving School.

On December 26, 1907, the high school district in Mesa was reorganized into the Mesa Union High School District. The Town Council had leased all of Block 20 to the University of Arizona for 99 years to use as an experimental farm. This was the land bounded by Center St and MacDonald, Second and Third Avenues. It didn't take long to discover that the block was not large enough. On January 4, 1908, they sold it to the school district for $75. Construction began immediately on the building known as "Old Main". The class of 1909 graduated from that original twelve room building. The school had a main floor auditorium with a swimming pool in the basement. The auditorium was used for assemblies, with folding chairs for the early comers and standing room only for the rest. Ten years later, eight more rooms were added plus a small auditorium-gymnasium. During basketball games, spectators sat in the balcony (above the freshman section) or on the stage because the gym was not wide enough for sideline bleachers.

In September 1932, a football player, named Zedo Ishikawa, was accidentally killed with a shotgun blast to the chest while attempting to break up a fight between two dogs. As he neared death he said, "Tell Coach Coutchie and the boys to carry on." As time went on, students began repeating the theme "Carry On" to one another. Eventually, it became the school's official motto.

In 1936, the WPA and PWA provided funds for new construction, and the New Building was constructed west of the Main Building with an arcade in between. The land for this was purchased from Harvey Bush, for $4,000. A new gymnasium building, which included an agriculture shop and auto shop, was also built south of the Main Building — the new site for school dances and basketball games.

In 1967, Mesa won their homecoming football game against rival Westwood High. Then, on Sunday night, October 1, 1967, a disastrous fire started in the science lab, completely destroying the sixty-year-old "Old Main." Classes continued to graduate from the old campus until 1972 when the new Mesa High was built, at a different location (farther east and south). The original Mesa High campus, minus the destroyed Old Main, would be reused in the 1970s as Mesa Central High School, which became the district's vocational school in the 1980s and closed in 1991.

In summer 2015, an aquatic center was added to the campus; it was run by the City of Mesa.

In 2016, the boys basketball team won state championship for Division 1, ending their 12-year championship drought.

Academics 
In the 1983–84 school year, it was honored as a Blue Ribbon school.

AIMS test scores for MHS were below the state average in reading, math, and writing for 2002 through 2004, but they improved to substantially above average for 2005.

Athletics 
The school won the 5A state championships in 2004 for boys basketball, and three straight 5A-I titles in wrestling from 2006 to 2008. Anthony Robles, who was born without a right leg, won individual state championships in 2005 and 2006. He later went on to win the 2006 Senior Nationals' and wrestled at Arizona State University on a full scholarship. Robles finished fourth at the 2009 NCAA Division I Championships at 125 pounds, seventh at the 2010 tournament, and was national champion in 2011.  Home to the Ordaz brothers; Mayk (160) and John Ordaz (130). The only two-time state champion siblings that both recorded undefeated seasons; twice in their high school career, (2009–2012), on the top ten wrestler list from Arizona. 

<small text>*The Arizona Interscholastic Association recognized these sports and the regular season games thereof as official during these years but did not conduct playoffs to determine AIA state champions for them until 1959 for football and 1983 for soccer. In such times, the press declared state champions (and state runners-up), similar to how the Associated Press independently crowns national champions for some sports at the college level.</small text>

Demographics 
During the 2020–2021 school year, the demographic break of the 3,460 students enrolled was:

 Male - 51.5%
 Female - 48.5%
 American Indian/Alaska Native - 2.1%
 Asian - 0.8%
 Black - 4.1%
 Hispanic - 67.2%
 Native Hawaiian/Pacific Islander - 0.6%
 White - 23.9%
 Multiracial - 1.3%

Feeder schools 

Junior high schools that feed into Mesa High School (and the elementary schools that feed into the junior high schools):

Kino Junior High School:

 Thomas Edison Elementary School
 Dwight D. Eisenhower Center for Innovation
 Oliver Wendell Holmes Elementary School
 John Kerr Elementary School
 Lehi Elementary School
 Abraham Lincoln Elementary School
 James Lowell Elementary School

Charles D. Poston Junior High School:

 Marjorie Entz Elementary School
 Eugene Field Elementary
 Nathan Hale Elementary School
 Michael Hughes Elementary
 Highland Arts Elementary School
 Henry Longfellow Elementary School

Harvey L. Taylor Junior High School

 Washington Irving Elementary School
 Veora Johnson Elementary School
 Helen Keller Elementary School
 Ann Morrow LIndbergh Elementary School
 James Madison Elementary School
 William S. Porter Elementary School
 Charles I. Robson Elementary School
 Marilyn Wilson Elementary School

Notable alumni 

 Jeremy Accardo – MLB Baltimore Orioles
 Wayne Brown – Mayor of Mesa from 1996 to 2000  
 Jahii Carson – professional basketball player
 Jim Carter – NCAA golf champion and PGA Tour
 Lee Cummard – NBA D-League Utah Flash
 Kyler Fackrell – NFL Green Bay Packers
 Aaron Fuller - NCAA Iowa/USC & professional basketball
 Jeff Groscost – Arizona House Speaker
 Mickey Hatcher – MLB player, 2-time World Series champion
 Robert Holcombe – NFL St. Louis Rams, Super Bowl champion
 Don Janicki — Marathon runner
 Keelan Johnson - NCAA football ASU & NFL Philadelphia Eagles
 Mirriam Johnson AKA Jessi Colter – recording artist
 Jack Lind – MLB Milwaukee Brewers
 Andy Livingston – NFL Pro Bowl selection
 Warren Livingston – NFL Dallas Cowboys
 Deuce Lutui – NCAA football champion, NFL Arizona Cardinals
 Mike MacDougal – MLB All-Star
 Orlando McKay – NFL wide receiver
 Phil Ortega – MLB Washington Senators
 Rudy Owens - MLB Houston Astros
 Anthony Robles – NCAA wrestling champion, ESPY winner
 Matt Salmon – US Congressman
 Vai Sikahema – NCAA football champion, 2-time NFL Pro Bowler
 Delbert Stapley – LDS Apostle
 Wilford "Whizzer" White – ASU football legend, NFL player
 Patsy Willard – US Olympic diving bronze medalist
 Yuridia – diamond-certified recording artist

References

External links

 Mesa High School Home of the Jackrabbits – Official Mesa High School Website
 GreatSchools.net Mesa High School School Overview – School Evaluation & Statistics
 Mesa Football – Official Football Site
 Mesa Basketball – Official Boys Basketball Site

Educational institutions established in 1899
High schools in Mesa, Arizona
Public high schools in Arizona
1899 establishments in Arizona Territory